The Xperia X2 (internal codename Vulcan), announced in September 2009, is a smartphone of the Xperia series by Sony Ericsson. It is the successor to the X1. Features include a 3.2-inch touchscreen, a sliding arc keyboard, 8.1 MP camera, Wi-Fi, GPS and 3G, among others. It runs Windows Mobile 6.5 and the home screen can be customised to the normal Windows Mobile 6.5 home screen, Xperia panels or an isometric pixel art city.

The Xperia X2 is the last Sony Ericsson phone to use the Windows Mobile operating system. The successor to the Xperia X2 is the Xperia X10, which runs on Android.

Vodafone cancelled plans to exclusively offer the phone.

In April 2010, Sony Ericsson launched its first upgrade (MR1). It upgraded Windows Mobile from 6.5.1 to 6.5.2 (which improved both the stability and usability of the device), it brought in the use of video telephony, an FM radio and it introduced fast GPS to get a quicker fix. As well as all this, MR1 upgraded many of the applications in the phone to improve speed and usability and fix any bugs.

The second update MR2 went live in May and Windows Mobile was updated to the 6.5.3. This was a significant upgrade in terms of usability, performance, power management and the browser experience. Despite that MR2 was undoubtedly a move in the right direction, most of users who send their feedback on official Sony Ericsson product blog, developer forums and Sony Ericsson fan sites continue to complain that even after MR2 device is still unstable and lacks some key features such as support for Bluetooth remote SIM access (rSAP) profile which make X2 unable to pair with any modern premium car kits which are built into Mercedes, BMW, Audi, Skoda etc. – an essential feature for business users and executives who were intended to be the main target customers for the handset. After the MR2 upgrade, Sony Ericsson ceased development for the phone. This decision from the Sony Ericsson management was an unfortunate move, because the phone still contained multiple bugs that made life difficult for its users. The phone still contains a serious bug that corrupts the SD-card's content, and makes it an unreliable tool for business-users. Many users confirmed this bug, and one user on the Xda-forum figured out the cause to this bug. Due to the dropped support from Sony Ericsson, a fix to the data-loss bug was introduced on the forum.

Images

References

  Sony Ericsson product launch blog

External links 
 Xperia X2 specifications
 Xperia X2 FUN SITE

X
Mobile phones with an integrated hardware keyboard
Mobile phones introduced in 2009
Slider phones